Władysław III of Poland may refer to:
Władysław III of Poland (1424-1444), also known as Władysław III of Varna, King of Poland
Władysław III Spindleshanks (1165?-1231), High Duke of Poland

See also
 Ladislaus (disambiguation)
 Ladislaus III (disambiguation)
 Władysław (disambiguation)